Podemos Extremadura is the regional branch in Extremadura of Podemos. The Secretary General is Irene de Miguel.

Electoral performance

Assembly of Extremadura

References

Extremadura
Political parties in Extremadura